Mostafa Seifi (born October 22, 1985) is an Iranian footballer who most recently plays for Naft Tehran in the IPL.

Club career
Seifi joined Mes Kerman F.C. in 2008 from Esteghlal Ahvaz F.C.

 Assist Goals

References

1985 births
Living people
Esteghlal Ahvaz players
Rah Ahan players
Sanat Mes Kerman F.C. players
Naft Tehran F.C. players
Iranian footballers
Association football midfielders
People from Qazvin